Family division may refer to:
 High Court of Justice#Family Division, the Family Division of Her Majesty's High Court of Justice in England 
 Divorce
 Annulment
 Division of property
 Alimony
 Parental responsibility (access and custody)
 Dysfunctional family

See also
 Family
 Family law